Matthew John Costello (born 1948) is an American writer specializing in the genres of horror, gothic, and science fiction. His articles have appeared in publications including the Los Angeles Times and Sports Illustrated. He has scripted Trilobyte's bestselling CD-ROM interactive dramas The 7th Guest and its sequel The 11th Hour, as well as many other video games.

Career
Costello continued Dana Lombardy's "Gaming" column on Asimov's Science Fiction beginning in April 1986, which renamed to "Neat Stuff" in April 1989 and he continued until June 1990.

Along with F. Paul Wilson, Costello created and scripted FTL Newsfeed, which ran daily on the Sci-Fi Channel from 1992–1996. His television credits also include shows on The Disney Channel, PBS, the BBC, and many others. In 2005 his novel Beneath Still Waters was adapted into a film by director Brian Yuzna.

Costello also wrote Island of the Skull (Pocket Books), an original prequel to Peter Jackson's film, King Kong.

Along with his adult genres, Costello has created works for children. His works include the book series The Kids of Einstein Elementary, (Scholastic), and Magic Everywhere (Random House), as well as games including Aladdin’s Mathquest (Disney), A Cartoon History of the Universe (Putnam), and two math games based on the hit PBS Kids show Cyberchase. He is the designer of role-playing and board games, including Dungeons & Dragons, Call of Cthulhu, Batman, Lone Wolf & Cub, and many others.

Recently, Costello worked on Rage, a post-apocalyptic action-adventure game for id Software, and wrote its novelization, as well as a new game for Eidos with Neil Richards and Swedish developer Avalanche Studios.

Novels

Sleep Tight (1987)
Revolt on Majipoor (1987)
Fate's Trick: In the World of Robert Heinlein's Glory Road (1988)
Beneath Still Waters (1989)
Midsummer (1990)
Child's Play 2 (1990)
Wurm (1991)
Child's Play 3 (1991)
Darkborn (1992)
Homecoming (1992)
Caught in Time (1992)
Garden (1993)
See How She Runs (1994)
SeaQuest DSV: Fire Bellow (1994)
The 7th Guest (1995) (with Craig Shaw Gardner)
Mirage (1996) (with F. Paul Wilson)
Masque (1998) (with F. Paul Wilson)
Unidentified (2002)
Artifact (2003) (with Kevin J. Anderson, Janet Berliner and F. Paul Wilson)
Missing Monday (2004)
King Kong: The Island of the Skull (2005)
Doom 3: Worlds on Fire (2008)
Doom 3: Maelstrom (2009)
Rage (video game) (adaptation) (2011)
Vacation (2011)
Home (2012)
Star Road (with Rick Hautala) (2014)

Videogames (script) 

The 7th Guest(1993), Virgin Interactive Entertainment (Europe) Ltd.
The 11th Hour (1995), Virgin Interactive Entertainment, Inc.
Clue Chronicles: Fatal Illusion (1999), Atari Interactive, Inc.
Starsky & Hutch (2003), Empire Interactive
The Italian Job (2003), Eidos Interactive, Inc.
Cyberchase: Castleblanca Quest (2003), Brighter Minds Media, Inc., Learning Company, The
Doom 3 (2004), Activision Publishing, Inc.
Shellshock: Nam '67 (2004), Eidos Interactive
Doom 3: Resurrection of Evil (2005), Activision Publishing, Inc.
Just Cause (2006), Eidos GmbH
Disney's Pirates of the Caribbean: At World's End (2007), Disney Interactive Studios
Just Cause 2 (2010), Eidos GmbH
Rage (2011), Bethesda Softworks
Planet of The Apes: The Last Frontier (2017), Imaginati Studios

Awards 

Bram Stoker Best Novel nominee (1993): Homecoming
Prometheus Award Best Novel nominee (1999): Masque

References

External links
 

 
 
 Matthew J. Costello at Demian's Gamebook Web Page
 Shane Christopher (pseudonym) at LC Authorities, 1 record, and at WorldCat

1948 births
Living people
20th-century American novelists
21st-century American novelists
American male novelists
American science fiction writers
Id Software people
Role-playing game designers
20th-century American male writers
21st-century American male writers
Date of birth missing (living people)